Taep'yŏng station is railway station in Taep'yŏng-ri, Man'gyŏngdae-guyŏk, P'yŏngyang, North Korea, on the P'yŏngnam Line of the Korean State Railway. The station is on the single-track mainline, serving as a halt for passenger trains.

The station was opened, along with the rest of the mainline of the P'yŏngnam Line, on 16 October 1910 by the Chosen Government Railway.

References

Railway stations in North Korea
Buildings and structures in Pyongyang
Transport in Pyongyang
Railway stations opened in 1910
1910 establishments in Korea